Ann Trevor (1899–1970) was a British actress. Her stage work included the original production of Noël Coward's Hay Fever at London's Ambassadors Theatre, in 1925.

Selected filmography
 Wuthering Heights (1920)
 Build Thy House (1920)
 The Headmaster (1921)
 Daniel Deronda (1921)
 A Tale of Two Cities (1922)
 A Rogue in Love (1922)
 Maria Marten, or The Murder in the Red Barn (1935)

References

External links

1899 births
1970 deaths
British film actresses
Actresses from London
British stage actresses
20th-century British actresses
20th-century English women
20th-century English people